The Kankakee Fish and Wildlife Area is situated in Starke County at the junction of the Yellow River  with the Kankakee River.  The state purchased  of marshland in 1927 for a Civilian Conservation Corp. camp.  The camp consisted of up to 400 men. After the camp closed, it was established as a game preserve.  In the 1950s waterfowl management was begun. In 1982 another  were added and in 1992 an additional .  The Fish and Wildlife area consist of the wetlands between the Yellow River and the Kankakee at their junction and uplands on both the north bank of the Kankakee and the south bank of the Yellow. The main entrance to the area is on Indiana State Road 39 at Indiana State Road 8.

The wildlife area is a remnant of the Grand Kankakee Marsh.  The Grand Kankakee Marsh was known worldwide for its waterfowl. Stories are told of skies blackened by the wings of countless numbers of ducks and geese.

Hunting
Kankakee Fish & Wildlife Area has hunting opportunities for deer, turkey, waterfowl, small-game, and furbearers. Call or see staff for more information.

Fishing
The Kankakee Fish & Wildlife Area has two boat ramps.  One in English Lake (juncture of the Yellow and Kankakee Rivers and the other on the Kankakee at Indiana State Road 39.  Common fish caught in the Kankakee River include; Large mouth and Small mouth Bass, catfish, and Northern Pike.  Common fish in the Yellow River are; Small mouth Bass, catfish, and Walleye. The most common fish that live in the ditches are the bowfin which can often be caught on topwater lures.

Wildlife Watching
A variety of birds can be seen in the area, including: wild turkey, ducks, geese, other waterfowl, hawks, owls, osprey, bald eagle and a wide variety of neo-tropical species.

Department of Natural Resources
The Indiana Department of Natural Resources manages the area.  The local office is at 4320 W Toto Rd., PO Box 77, North Judson, IN 46366, (574) 896-3522

References

External links
 Indiana DNR Kankakee

Parks in Indiana
Protected areas of Starke County, Indiana